The Best American Poetry 2001, a volume in The Best American Poetry series, was edited by David Lehman and by guest editor Robert Hass.

Background

In his introduction, Hass wrote, "There are roughly three traditions in American poetry at this point: a metrical tradition that can be very nervy and that is also basically classical in impulse; a strong central tradition of free verse made out of both romanticism and modernism, split between the impulses of an inward and psychological writing and an outward and realist one, at its best fusing the two; and an experimental tradition that is usually more passionate about form than content, perception than emotion, restless with the conventions of the art, skeptical about the political underpinnings of current practice, and intent on inventing a new one, or at least undermining what seems repressive in the current formed style. [...] At the moment there are poets doing good, bad, and indifferent work in all these ranges."

Speaking of the selection process for his editorship, Hass observed that he received "boxes...[of] xeroxes and notations of the indefatigable David Lehman....I had marked for rereading a couple of hundred poems [myself] and I had David's sometimes overlapping lists..." .

Maureen McLane, in a book review in The Chicago Tribune, said of Hass' description that "it's hard to imagine a more judicious account of major tendencies."

"While many charming, witty poems have made it into this anthology, there are plenty of others that would seem to evade not only the perils of being charming but indeed the strictures of being a poem, conventionally understood," McLane wrote. She found the selections by Joshua Clover Thomas Sayers Ellis, Cal Bedient, Robert Bly, Michael Burkard and Claudia Rankine confusing (but not necessarily bad poems for that reason), and praised the work by Brenda Hillman, Louise Glück, Alan Feldman, Bernard Welt, Joshua Clover, Thomas Sayers Ellis, Fanny Howe, Michael Palmer, Lydia Davis, Rachel Rose, David Kirby, Jewelle Gomez, Noelle Kocot and Grace Paley.

Hass also included newly published work by the late Elizabeth Bishop and James Schuyler. Schuyler's poem was discovered by David Lehman in May 1994 in John Ashbery's archive at Harvard's Houghton Library and appeared six years later in "The New Yorker". One of the poems Hass chose for the volume was by his wife, Brenda Hillman.

Poets and poems included

See also
 2001 in poetry

Notes

External links
 Web page for contents of the book, with links to each publication where the poems originally appeared
  "The Best I Can Do This Year: Lehman's "Best American Poetry 2001" by Joan Houlihan

Best American Poetry 2001, The
Best American Poetry 2001, The
Poetry
American poetry anthologies